Jonas Røndbjerg (born 31 March 1999) is a Danish professional ice hockey forward who is currently playing with the Henderson Silver Knights in the American Hockey League (AHL) while under contract as a prospect for the Vegas Golden Knights of the National Hockey League (NHL). At the 2017 NHL Entry Draft, Røndbjerg was selected 65th overall by the Golden Knights.

Playing career
Røndbjerg made his professional debut playing in his native Denmark, with Rungsted Seier Capital in the Metal Ligaen during the 2014–15 season. In order to further his development, Røndbjerg moved to Sweden to join the Växjö Lakers of the Swedish Hockey League prior to the 2016–17 season.

During the 2017–18 season, Røndbjerg established personal best marks with 6 goals and 5 assists to finish with 11 points in 35 games with the Lakers. He returned the following season with the Lakers to contribute 4 goals and 6 points in 44 games during the 2018–19 campaign.

On 30 May 2019, Røndbjerg agreed to a three-year, entry-level contract with the Vegas Golden Knights.

International play
Røndbjerg made his fourth World Juniors Championships appearance for Denmark serving as Captain at the 2019 World Junior Championship. He posted 1 goal and 2 points in 6 games, unable to keep Denmark from returning to Division 1.

Career statistics

Regular season and playoffs

International

References

External links
 

1999 births
Living people
Chicago Wolves players
Danish ice hockey forwards
Henderson Silver Knights players
IF Troja/Ljungby players
Växjö Lakers players
Vegas Golden Knights draft picks
Vegas Golden Knights players